Home Oil Company Limited was a Canadian independent petroleum company that existed from 1925 and 1995. Home was founded to produce oil in the Turner Valley field, and by the end of World War II was the country's largest independent producer. Between 1952 and 1972, Home was controlled by Robert A. Brown, Jr., who pursued an aggressive and high-risk strategy. From 1979 and 1991 Home Oil operated as a wholly-owned subsidiary, first of the Consumers' Gas Company, then of Hiram Walker, and lastly of the Interprovincial Pipe Line Company. On 1 May 1991, Home Oil regained its independent status, which it retained for the duration of its existence. In 1995, Anderson Exploration acquired Home for C$879 million. After Devon Energy acquired Anderson in 2001, Home was finally struck off in September 2002.

History 
Home was founded in 1925 by James R. Lowery and was backed by a group of establishment businessmen from Vancouver. By 1952, Robert A. Brown, Jr had acquired control of home. He ran the company until 1971, when personal debt forced him to sell his stake. At that time the company was purchased by the Consumers' Gas Company Limited, based in Toronto. In 1980 Consumers' was acquired by Hiram Walker, which ran Home until 1986.

References

External links 
 Home Oil Company Ltd Fonds – Held by the Glenbow Museum
 Home Oil Company Limited – Canadian Corporate Reports, at the McGill Digital Archives
Companies based in Calgary
Canadian companies established in 1925
Defunct companies of Canada
Defunct energy companies of Canada
Defunct oil and gas companies of Canada
Defunct oil companies
Oil and gas companies
Oil companies of Canada